Arturo Alsina (September 16, 1897 - May 24, 1984) was a Paraguayan writer and dramatist.  Born in Tucumán, Argentina to a family of Catalan origin, he moved to Paraguay with his family in 1909.  He remained there the rest of his life, dying in Asunción.

Alsina's circle of acquaintance was wide, and he counted among his friends many of the leading Paraguayan intellectuals of the day.  Among them were Adriano Irala, Carlos R. Centurión, Vicente Lamas, Natalicio González, Alejandro Guanes, Hérib Campos Cervera, Julio Correa, Narciso R. Colmán, Roque Centurión Miranda, Agustín Barrios, José Asunción Flores, Juan Samudio, Jaime Bestard, Pablo Alborno, and Juan Sorazábal.  He also worked closely with Manuel Ortiz Guerrero, writing the prologue for the latter's complete works, as well as the Historia de la Cultura Paraguaya by Centurión.

1897 births
1984 deaths
People from San Miguel de Tucumán
Paraguayan people of Catalan descent
Paraguayan dramatists and playwrights
Paraguayan male writers
Male dramatists and playwrights
20th-century dramatists and playwrights
20th-century male writers